
Year 430 (CDXXX) was a common year starting on Wednesday (link will display the full calendar) of the Julian calendar. At the time, it was known as the Year of the Consulship of Theodosius and Valentinianus (or, less frequently, year 1183 Ab urbe condita). The denomination 430 for this year has been used since the early medieval period, when the Anno Domini calendar era became the prevalent method in Europe for naming years.

Events 
 By place 
 Roman Empire 
 Spring – The Vandals under King Genseric extend their power in North Africa along the Mediterranean Sea, and lay siege to Hippo Regius (where Augustine has recently been bishop).
 Flavius Aetius gains appointment as master of both services (magister utriusque militiae), after gaining victories in Gaul over Visigoth and Frankish forces.
 The Huns led by Octar attack the Burgundians, who occupied territory on the Rhine near the city of Worms (Germany). During the fighting Octar dies, and his army is destroyed.   
 Flavius Felix, his wife and a deacon are accused of plotting against Aetius. They are arrested in Ravenna and executed. Aetius is granted the title of patricius (Roman nobility).

 Asia 
 Feng Ba abdicates as emperor of the Northern Yan, one of the states vying for control of China. He is succeeded by his brother Feng Hong. 

 By topic 
 Religion 
 August 28 – Augustine dies during the siege of Hippo Regius at age 75, leaving behind his monumental work The City of God and other works that will have influence on Christianity. 
 Saint Patrick reaches Ireland on his missionary expedition (approximate date).
 Peter the Iberian founds a Georgian monastery near Bethlehem.

Births 
 Asclepigenia, Athenian philosopher and mystic (d. 485)
 Julius Nepos, Western Roman Emperor (d. 480)
 Marcia Euphemia, Roman Empress (approximate date)
 Sidonius Apollinaris, bishop and diplomat (approximate date)
 Syagrius, Roman official and son of Aegidius
 Victor Vitensis, African bishop (approximate date)
 Xiao Wu Di, emperor of the Liu Song Dynasty (d. 464)

Deaths 
 August 28 – Augustine of Hippo, bishop and theologian (b. 354)
 Abdas, bishop of Susa
 Saint Aurelius, bishop of Carthage (approximate date)
 Feng Ba, emperor of the Chinese state Northern Yan
 Flavius Felix, Roman consul
 Nilus of Sinai, bishop and saint (approximate date)
 Octar, Hunnic ruler (approximate date)
 Plutarch of Athens, Greek philosopher

References